De Valk is a tower mill and museum in Leiden, Netherlands.

The current tower mill is the third mill built at this location. In 1611 the post mill "De Valck" was built, and in 1667 it was replaced by a wooden post mill. In 1743 a higher tower mill was built. De Valk originally was equipped with six mill stones. There were two dwellings in the mill, originally for the two owners, later for the miller and his assistant.

In June 1966 the mill became a municipal museum. In 2000, the De Valk mill became operationally functional again and has been used for milling.

Gallery

External links 
 Stedelijk Molenmuseum De Valk

Tower mills in the Netherlands
Museums in Leiden
Towers completed in 1743